Heers is a municipality located in the Belgian province of Limburg. Since 1971 it comprises the parishes Batsheers, Opheers, Veulen, Gutschoven and Mettekoven, and since 1977 also Mechelen-Bovelingen, Rukkelingen-Loon (which in 1971 had formed Bovelingen), Heks, Horpmaal, Vechmaal (which in 1971 had formed Heks), and Klein-Gelmen (which between 1971 and 1977 had been part of Gelmen, during those years a separate municipality of which the other parishes now belong to the municipality of Sint-Truiden).

References

External links
 
 Site (personal) on Heers – Description of and historical information about each of the parishes of Heers 

Municipalities of Limburg (Belgium)